Xfm (X File Manager) is a graphical file manager for the X Window System.

XFM does not require an xtoolkit 

The xfm filemanager does not require an X Toolkit and interfaces to X using the following X11 libraries:

libx11 X11 client-side library
libxmu6 X11 miscellaneous utility library
X PixMap library
X Toolkit Intrinsics library
Xaw3d (Athena) widget set

References

External links 

Xfm Webpage

Free file managers